Kellee Stewart (born March 31, 1976) is an American actress.

Early life
Stewart grew up in Norristown, Pennsylvania and graduated from Norristown Area High School in 1993. Stewart also attended the BFA Acting Program at State University of New York at Purchase. Stewart graduated with honors and lived in New York City, New York and worked as a talent agent at Funny Face Today, FFT before moving to California.

Career
Stewart is best known for her role of Keisha in the 2005 hit movie Guess Who alongside Bernie Mac and  friend Zoe Saldana. From 2006 to 2010 Stewart played Stephanie Lane on the TBS sitcom My Boys. Stewart has continued her television career appearing in hit shows including Law and Order: SVU, FOX's The Resident, NBC's Whitney, Adult Swim's hit comedy Newsreaders, FOX's Bones, and ABC's Black-ish just to name a few. Stewart recurred on TV Land's long running comedy The Soul Man opposite Cedric The Entertainer and her sister Niecy Nash. In film, she co-starred in Hot Tub Time Machine (2010), Hot Tub Time Machine 2, as well as the indie hit Hunter Gatherer alongside Andre Royo.  She starred in several comedy pilots, like ABC's Middle Age Rage, Damaged Goods, and CBS's pilot Pandas In New York. She was cast in recurring role on Lifetime series Witches of East End. And was also cast as series regular in Lifetime drama pilot HR opposite Alicia Silverstone.

In 2016, Stewart was cast as Madonna Reed in NBC's supernatural drama Midnight Texas, based on the book series by Charlaine Harris. Stewart reprised her role in the drama premiering its second season in 2018.

Stewart began her producing and writing career when she created a single camera comedy for 20th Century Fox Studios and FOX Broadcasting Network titled BBF (Black Best Friend). The comedy was based on her real life casting experiences and childhood relationships. BBF is co-created with Sebastian Jones, who also serves as an executive producer and head writer. In addition to starring in BBF, Stewart serves as executive producer and co-writer of story.

In 2017, Stewart was seen in a starring role in Lifetime network's movie Love By The 10th Date written and directed by Nzingah Stewart. 

Currently, Stewart is writing and developing content for various television and media outlets.

Filmography

Film/Movie

Television

References

External links

1976 births
Living people
21st-century American actresses
Actresses from Pennsylvania
African-American actresses
American film actresses
American television actresses
People from Norristown, Pennsylvania
21st-century African-American women
21st-century African-American people
20th-century African-American people
20th-century African-American women